Wigan Metropolitan Borough Council elections are generally held three years out of every four, with a third of the council being elected each time. Wigan Metropolitan Borough Council, generally known as Wigan Council, is the local authority for the metropolitan borough of Wigan in Greater Manchester, England. Since the last boundary changes in 2004, 75 councillors have been elected from 25 wards.

Political control
From 1889 to 1974 Wigan was a county borough, independent of any county council. Under the Local Government Act 1972 it had its territory enlarged and became a metropolitan borough, with Greater Manchester County Council providing county-level services. The first election to the reconstituted borough council was held in 1973, initially operating as a shadow authority before coming into its revised powers on 1 April 1974. Greater Manchester County Council was abolished in 1986 and Wigan became a unitary authority. Political control of the council since 1973 has been held by the following parties:

Leadership
The leaders of the council since 1991 have been:

Council elections
Summary of the council composition after council elections, click on the year for full details of each election. Boundary changes took place for the 1980 election, and more recently the 2004 election – which increased the number of seats by three. Both needed the whole council to be elected in those years.

Borough result maps

By-election results

References

External links
Wigan Metropolitan Borough Council

 
Local government in the Metropolitan Borough of Wigan
Council elections in Greater Manchester
Elections in the Metropolitan Borough of Wigan
Metropolitan borough council elections in England